Crab Island is a small island on the Ohio River in Tyler County, West Virginia. The island lies just off the shore from the city of Sistersville. Crab Island is protected as part of the Ohio River Islands National Wildlife Refuge.

See also 
List of islands of West Virginia

References

River islands of West Virginia
Islands of Tyler County, West Virginia
Islands of the Ohio River